The 2012 FedEx Cup Playoffs, the series of four golf tournaments that determined the season champion on the U.S.-based PGA Tour, began on August 23 and ended on September 23. It included the following four events:
The Barclays – Bethpage State Park, Farmingdale, New York
Deutsche Bank Championship – TPC Boston, Norton, Massachusetts
BMW Championship – Crooked Stick Golf Club, Carmel, Indiana
Tour Championship – East Lake Golf Club, Atlanta, Georgia

Brandt Snedeker won the FedEx Cup by winning the Tour Championship.

These were the sixth FedEx Cup playoffs since their inception in 2007.

The point distributions can be seen here.

Regular season rankings

The Barclays
The Barclays was played August 23–26. Of the 125 players eligible to play in the event, two did not enter: Jason Dufner (ranked 2) and Spencer Levin (45). Of the 123 entrants, 75 made the second-round cut at 143 (+1).

Nick Watney won by three strokes over Brandt Snedeker and moved to first place in the standings. The top 100 players in the points standings advanced to the Deutsche Bank Championship. This included six players who were outside the top 100 prior to The Barclays: Graham DeLaet (ranked 106th to 44th), Bob Estes (103 to 62), David Hearn (108 to 67), Jason Day (113 to 88), Tommy Gainey (102 to 91), and Jonas Blixt (101 to 97). Six players started the tournament within the top 100 but ended the tournament outside the top 100, ending their playoff chances: John Mallinger (ranked 88th to 101st), Will Claxton (89 to 102), Chad Campbell (91 to 104), Andrés Romero (93 to 106), Freddie Jacobson (95 to 105), and Chris Stroud (99 to 110).

Par 71 course

Deutsche Bank Championship
The Deutsche Bank Championship was played August 31 – September 3. Of the 100 players eligible to play in the event, two did not enter: Sergio García (ranked 10) and David Toms (89). Of the 98 entrants, 78 made the second-round cut at one-over-par, 145.

Rory McIlroy won by one stroke over Louis Oosthuizen and moved into first place in the standings. The top 70 players in the points standings advanced to the BMW Championship. This included nine players who were outside the top 70 prior to the Deutsche Bank Championship: Jeff Overton (83 to 40), Bryce Molder (93 to 45), D. A. Points (72 to 54), Troy Matteson (78 to 59), Matt Every (75 to 63), Chris Kirk (81 to 66), Charl Schwartzel (71 to 68), Charley Hoffman (86 to 69) and Dicky Pride (96 to 70). Nine players started the tournament within the top 70 but ended the tournament outside the top 70, ending their playoff chances: Josh Teater (64 to 73), John Rollins (58 to 74), Scott Stallings (61 to 75), Ken Duke (60 to 76), Harris English (63 to 79), Jonathan Byrd (69 to 82), Spencer Levin (66 to 83), Charles Howell III (68 to 84) and Brian Davis (70 to 85).

Par 71 course

BMW Championship
The BMW Championship was played September 6–9. All 70 players eligible to play in the event did so. There was no cut.

Rory McIlroy won his second straight playoff event. He won by two strokes over Phil Mickelson and Lee Westwood. Two players played their way into the Tour Championship: Robert Garrigus (ranked 31 to ranked 20) by finishing tied for 4th, and Ryan Moore (35 to 28) by finishing T-10. Two players played their way out of the Tour Championship: Kyle Stanley (30 to 31) by finishing T-34, and Bill Haas (28 to 32) by finishing T-45. Haas was the defending FedEx Cup champion and this was the sixth straight year that the defending champion failed to make the Tour Championship. Three players, Hunter Mahan, Phil Mickelson, and Steve Stricker, have made the Tour Championship in each year of the playoffs.

The top 30 players in FedEx Cup points after this event advanced to the Tour Championship and also earned spots in the 2013 Masters Tournament, U.S. Open, and (British) Open Championship.

With the FedEx Cup points reset after the BMW Championship, all 30 remaining players have at least a mathematical chance to secure the season crown, and any of the top five players can claim the FedEx Cup with a win in the Tour Championship.

Par 72 course

Reset points
The points were reset after the BMW Championship.

Tour Championship
The Tour Championship was played September 20–23, after a one-week break. All 30 golfers who qualified for the tournament played, and there was no cut. Brandt Snedeker won the tournament by three shots from Justin Rose, and the FedEx Cup.

Par 70 course

Final leaderboard

For the full list see here.

Table of qualifying players
Table key:

* First-time Playoffs participant

References

External links
Coverage on the PGA Tour's official site
2012 FedEx Cup Playoffs Guidebook

FedEx Cup
FedEx Cup Playoffs